Plawsworth is a village in County Durham, in England. It is situated a short distance to the east of Sacriston, on the A167 between Durham and Chester-le-Street.

External links

Villages in County Durham